Brookula iredalei is an extinct species of sea snail, a marine gastropod mollusk, unassigned in the superfamily Seguenzioidea.

These species was found in the Coast of Rio de Janeiro State in South America. There were specifically nine different species that were found, however, the Brookula Iredalei was distinct due to the differences in its axial ribs and spiral cords.

References

iredalei
Taxa named by Harold John Finlay